Lakekamu-Tauri Rural LLG is a local-level government (LLG) of Gulf Province, Papua New Guinea.

Wards
01. Ipihia/Titikaini
02. Wanto
03. Kakiva
04. Putei
05. Kakoro
06. Okaivai
07. Heavala
08. Heatoare
83. Malalaua Urban

References

Local-level governments of Gulf Province